The Second cabinet of Jóhanna Sigurðardóttir in Iceland was formed 10 May 2009. The cabinet left office on 23 May 2013.

Cabinets

Inaugural cabinet: 10 May 2009 – 1 October 2009

First reshuffle: 1 October 2009 – 2 September 2010
The Ministry of Communications (Samgönguráðuneytið) was renamed the Ministry of Transport, Communications and Local Government (Samgöngu- og sveitarstjórnarráðuneytið). The Ministry of Education, Science and Culture was renamed in Icelandic from Menntamálaráðuneytið (lit. Ministry of Education) to Mennta- og menningarmálaráðuneytið (lit. Ministry of Education and Culture) but the English name was unchanged. The Ministry of Trade (Viðskiptaráðuneytið) was renamed Ministry of Economic Affairs (Efnahags- og viðskiptaráðuneytið). The Ministry of Justice and Ecclesiastical Affairs (Dóms- og kirkjumálaráðuneytið) was renamed Ministry of Justice and Human Rights (Dómsmála- og mannréttindaráðuneytið). Álfheiður Ingadóttir replaced Ögmundur Jónasson as Minister of Health.

Second reshuffle: 2 September 2010 – 31 December 2011
Guðbjartur Hannesson replaced Álfheiður Ingadóttir as Minister of Health and Árni Páll Árnason as Minister of Social Affairs and Social Security. Ögmundur Jónasson replaced Kristján L. Möller as Minister of Transport, Communications and Local Government and Ragna Árnadóttir as Minister of Justice and Human Rights.

Third reshuffle: 31 December 2011 – 23 May 2013
Oddný Guðbjörg Harðardóttir replaced Steingrímur J. Sigfússon as Minister of Finance. Steingrímur J. Sigfússon replaced Árni Páll Árnason as Minister of Economic Affairs and Jón Bjarnason as Minister of Fisheries and Agriculture.

Change: 1 January 2011
The Ministry of Justice and Human Rights and the Ministry of Transport, Communications and Local Government merged to form the Ministry of the Interior (Innanríkisráðuneytið). The Ministry of Health and the Ministry of Social Affairs and Social Security merged to form the Ministry of Welfare (Velferðarráðuneytið).

Change: 1 September 2012
The Ministry of Fisheries and Agriculture, the Ministry of Industry, Energy and Tourism and part of the Ministry of Economic Affairs merged to form the Ministry of Industries and Innovation (Atvinnuvega- og nýsköpunarráðuneytið), led by Steingrímur J. Sigfússon. The Ministry for the Environment was renamed Ministry for the Environment and Natural Resources (Umhverfis- og auðlindaráðuneytið) and the Ministry of Finance and part of the Ministry of Economic Affairs merged to form the Ministry of Finance and Economic Affairs (Fjármála- og efnahagsráðuneytið), led by Oddný Guðbjörg Harðardóttir.

See also
Government of Iceland
Cabinet of Iceland

References

Johanna Sigurdardottir, Second cabinet of
Johanna Sigurdardottir, Second cabinet of
Johanna Sigurdardottir, Second cabinet of
Cabinets established in 2009
Cabinets disestablished in 2013
Social Democratic Alliance